The Better Life is the debut studio album by American rock band 3 Doors Down, released on February 8, 2000. It has become 7× Platinum since release. This is the only album on which lead singer Brad Arnold played drums. "Kryptonite", "Loser", and "Be Like That" all reached the Billboard Hot 100 chart, peaking at  3, No. 55, and No. 24, respectively. The Better Life sold over six million copies worldwide.

It is the band's best-selling album to date, with sales of over 5,653,000 copies in the United States, as of July 2014.

Background 
In 1997, 3 Doors Down released a self-titled demo CD that garnered attention locally. Only 2,000 copies of the demo are known to exist and its track listing is mostly shared with The Better Life. Six songs from the demo were later re-recorded and polished for commercial viability on The Better Life. The final demo track, "Sarah Yellin' 86," was re-recorded as "Sarah Yellin'" on the band's second studio album, Away from the Sun, in 2002. Studio recordings of two tracks from the demo, "Dead Love" and "Man In My Mind," were produced, but never released. Five songs, "Duck and Run," "Not Enough," "Be Like That," "Better Life," and "So I Need You," were added for The Better Life after the band had been picked up by Universal Records.

In 2007, a two-disc version of the album, The Better Life: Deluxe Edition, was released and included an audio recording of a 2003 concert. In 2021, a remaster of the album, The Better Life: 20th Anniversary Edition, was released on CD, vinyl, and digital download; all three versions include the band's eponymous 1997 demo, with the ten songs being listed as the "Escatawpa Sessions." The CD and digital releases of the 20th Anniversary Edition also include acoustic versions of "Kryptonite" and "Be Like That," along with "The Better Life (XX Mix)" and the studio recording of "Wasted Me" as bonus tracks.

Track listing

Deluxe Edition bonus CD
On September 18, 2007, the Deluxe Edition with a bonus second disc was released, which features a live performance recorded in 2003 at Cynthia Woods Mitchell Pavilion in Houston, Texas.

Personnel
Credits adapted from album's liner notes.

3 Doors Down
 Brad Arnold – lead vocals, drums
 Matt Roberts – rhythm and lead guitars
 Chris Henderson – rhythm and lead guitars
 Todd Harrell – bass guitar

Additional musicians
 Kevin Paige – keyboards (tracks 2, 3, 5)

Production
 Paul Ebersold – producer, engineer
 Matt Martone – engineer
 Toby Wright – mixing
 Mike Butler – mixing assistant
 Stephen Marcussen – mastering
 Andrew Garver – digital editing

Singles
 "Kryptonite" – 2000
 Reached No. 3 on the US Hot 100
 Reached No. 1 on the US Modern Rock (11 weeks) and US Mainstream Rock (nine weeks)
 "Loser" – July 29, 2000
 Reached No. 55 on the US Hot 100
 Reached No. 2 on the US Modern Rock
 Reached No. 1 on the US Mainstream Rock (21 weeks)
 "Duck and Run" – 2000
 Reached No. 11 on the US Modern Rock
 Reached No. 1 on the US Mainstream Rock (three weeks)
 "Be Like That" – May 20, 2001
 Reached No. 24 on the US Hot 100
 Reached No. 22 on the US Modern Rock
 Reached No. 10 on the US Mainstream Rock

Charts

Weekly charts

Year-end charts

Decade-end charts

Certifications

References

External links
 

2000 debut albums
3 Doors Down albums